The Gottfried Furniture Company Building is a historic commercial building located in Springfield, Missouri, United States. Built around 1890, it is a three-story, rectangular, Late Victorian-style red-painted brick commercial building. It features a lavish presentation of metal ornamentation and corbeled brick at the roofline, upper-story windows and storefront.

It was listed on the National Register of Historic Places in 2007.

References

Commercial buildings on the National Register of Historic Places in Missouri
Victorian architecture in Missouri
Commercial buildings completed in 1890
Buildings and structures in Springfield, Missouri
National Register of Historic Places in Greene County, Missouri